The Estádio Municipal Jorge Sampaio is an association football stadium located in Pedroso, Portugal, which is used by FC Porto B as their home ground.

References

FC Porto B
Football venues in Portugal
Sports venues completed in 2003